Antonio Decaro (born 17 July 1970) is an Italian politician, current Mayor of Bari.

Biography
Decaro graduated in engineering at the Polytechnic University of Bari. After a brief work experience as deputy head compartment of the Apulian Aqueduct, he has been employed by ANAS in 2000.

In 2004 he was hired by mayor of Bari Michele Emiliano as Councilor for mobility and traffic, distinguishing himself for his environmentalism: Decaro has contributed to the implementation of initiatives and infrastructures that have marked the change in the mobility and traffic policies in Bari. His goal was to empty the city center from cars and re-qualify the spaces and lifestyle of citizens and commuters.

In 2010 he is elected regional councilor in Apulia with the Democratic Party and became group leader of the party in the regional assembly from 2010 to 2013, when he is elected Deputy after the 2013 elections.

In January 2014, he announced on his Facebook page his intention to run for the role of mayor of Bari. In June, he is elected mayor, with the support of his predecessor Michele Emiliano, the Democratic Party, Left Ecology Freedom, Italy of Values and the Democratic Centre.

On 12 October 2016, Decaro is elected President of the National Association of Italian Comunes, the association of all the mayors of the country.

On 26 May 2019, Decaro ran for re-election as mayor of Bari. He won handily with nearly two-thirds of the vote (66.27%) in the first round, thus avoiding a runoff.

In 2020, in the midst of the Coronavirus pandemic that ravaged Northern Italy, Decaro even though he's mayor of a Southern city, became a social media star and instant sensation overnight due to his strong-mannered rebukes of citizens who wouldn't respect the stay-at-home rule. Mayor Decaro even had Facebook and Instagram fan pages founded by women who immediately claimed to be attracted to him after his online rants appealing to his constituents became popular.

References

External links 
Files about his parliamentary activities (in Italian): XVII legislature.

1970 births
Living people
People from Bari
Democratic Party (Italy) politicians
Politicians of Apulia
Deputies of Legislature XVII of Italy
21st-century Italian politicians
Mayors of Bari